This is a list of the episodes of the anime series The Wallflower, created by Tomoko Hayakawa and directed by Shinichi Watanabe.

Episodes

References

Episodes
Wallflower